Mac Clark (Acacia peuce) Conservation Reserve is a protected area in the Northern Territory of Australia located in the locality of Ghan.

The reserve is surrounded by the pastoral lease and operating cattle station, Andado, the area also lies on the western edge of the Simpson Desert.

The area is fenced to protect it from stock. It can be accessed via the old Andado track or the Binns track via Ltyentye Apurte Community or from Kulgera via the Stuart Highway.

The traditional owners of the area are the Arrente peoples who lived and travelled through the area for thousands of years. The area is rich in Aboriginal artefacts and the name of the pastoral lease is derived from the Arrente word meaning stone tool.

Europeans arrived in the area in the 1880s and settled the lands for pastoralism, raising both sheep and more recently cattle. Malcolm Mac Clark and his wife Molly arrived at Andado Station in 1955, Mac Died of a heart attack in 1978. The reserve bears his name as a result of his interest in conserving the trees found there.

The reserve was established to preserve the rare Acacia peuce tree, also known as Waddywood,  of which there is a stand of 1,000 mature trees found within the reserve. During the 1900s most of these trees had been cut down to make shelters and stockyards until there were only three populations left: One at Andado, another near to Birdsville and the last near Boulia. Prolonged drought, fire, rabbits and livestock are all a threat to any seedlings. Studies are being conducted in the area  on regeneration rate and growth rate of the trees.

In 1991, The conservation reserve was listed on the now-defunct Register of the National Estate in 1991 and was added to the Northern Territory Heritage Register on 14 September 1994.

See also
Protected areas of the Northern Territory

References

Conservation reserves in the Northern Territory
1982 establishments in Australia
Protected areas established in 1982
Northern Territory places listed on the defunct Register of the National Estate
Northern Territory Heritage Register